Swamp paperbark is a common name for several plants and may refer to:
Melaleuca ericifolia, a species of tree or shrub from eastern Australia
Melaleuca halmaturorum, a species of tree from Western Australia
Melaleuca rhaphiophylla, a tree species from Western Australia